Villers-Bocage may refer to the following communes in France:

 Villers-Bocage, Calvados
 Battle of Villers-Bocage, 1944
 Villers-Bocage, Somme